It's Not How You Start, It's How You Finish is the third full-length album by The Hours. It was released on 5 October 2010 through Adeline Records. It features songs from their previous two albums, released only in Europe.

Track listing
"Ali In The Jungle"
"These Days"
"Big Black Hole"
"Back When You Were Good"
"Never See You Again"
"I Miss You"
"Icarus"
"1000 Years"
"Come On"
"Narcissus Road"
"See The Light"
"Born To Be (Deluxe Edition)"
"Murder Or Suicide (Deluxe Edition)"
"Fade Into You (Deluxe Edition)"

2010 albums
The Hours (band) albums